Thoix is a commune in the Somme department in Hauts-de-France in northern France.

Geography
The Parquets river, a small tributary of the river Évoissons, which flows into the Selle, has its source in Thoix and also feeds the castle moat

Population

History
The village has been known by many names over the centuries: Teoletum, Teoleium,  Tois in 1140, Thois in 1212 and Thoys by 1301. The inhabitants are known as Téoduliens.

Guillaume Gouffier, seigneur de Bonnivet (1488–1525), a favourite of king Francis I, was seigneur of Thoix.

Places of interest
 The fifteenth-century château.
 Saint-Etienne's fifteenth-century church
 A fifteenth-century stone cross in the square
 A dovecote in the courtyard of the farm opposite the château
 A memorial to an aerial combat between a French aeroplane and 8 German fighter planes on 5 June 1940.

See also
Communes of the Somme department

References

External links

 Page about the Château de Thoix 

Communes of Somme (department)